is a city located in Sorachi Subprefecture, Hokkaido, Japan.

As of 2013, the city has an estimated population of 24,768, and the density of 89.2 persons per km2. The total area is 277.61 km2.

History
The name Bibai is derived from Ainu word "pipa o i", meaning "Place (swamp) with many cockscomb pearl mussels".
1890 - The village of Numakai was founded.
1925 - Numakai village became Numakai town.
1926 - Numakai was renamed Bibai.
1950 - Bibai town became Bibai city.
1982 - Bibai Dam was completed.
At its peak, Bibai was a coal town that produced over a million tons annually. However, ever since the mine was closed in 1972, the city has suffered a slowly declining population.

Geography
Ishikari River flows to west of Bibai. Bibai Dam was built on the Bibai River, a tributary of Ishikari River.

Lake Miyajima was registered as a wetland under the Ramsar Convention in 2002.

Climate

Education

High schools
 Hokkaido Bibai Shoei High School
 Hokkaido Bibai Seika High School

School for special needs
 Hokkaido Bibai School for Special Needs

Transportation

Rail
Hakodate Main Line Minami-Bibai Branch Line used to run from Bibai to Minami-Bibai.
 Hakodate Main Line : Minenobu - Kōshunai - Bibai - Chashinai

Road
Straight line section of Route 12 is the longest in Japan.
 Hokkaidō Expressway
 Route 12

Culture

Mascots

He is a greater white-fronted goose. He is unveiled in 1986.  is Mami-chan's assistant who is a yakitori.

References

External links 
 Official Website 

Cities in Hokkaido